Holiday Layaway Donations are when a benefactor pays for another person's layaway purchases, so the layaway participant receives their purchases for free. Layaway donations are common during the Christmas shopping season and are sometimes given anonymously. The popularity of holiday layaway donations has been growing since 2011.  Layaway donations have been donated by well-known people such as Tim Tebow,  and Marcus Morris and Markieff Morris.

Payaway the Layaway is a charity foundation that often teams up with athletes and celebrities to collects money to pay off layaway purchases.

Notable Donations in 2016 
Professional baseball player Dexter Fowler surprised 43 families in Chicago by paying for their layaway purchases. Professional basketball player Mike Muscala paid several thousand dollars for toy purchases that were on layaway in Atlanta, Georgia. Andre Drummond of the Detroit Pistons paid for Christmas gifts for several families in Waterford, Michigan.

Notable Donations in 2017 
Professional basketball players Marcus Morris and Markieff Morris paid for gifts put on layaway at a Philadelphia Walmart.

Notable Donations in 2018 
Director and actor Tyler Perry donated $430,000 in layaway items at two Walmart stores in Georgia. Jimmy John Liautaud, owner of the sandwich chain “Jimmy John’s” donated more than $81,000 to Walmart shoppers in Illinois.  Singer and songwriter Kid Rock donated $81,000 to a Walmart in Tennessee. "Good Morning America" challenged its viewers to pay off layaway purchases, and raised more than $200,000 for the cause.

References 

Charities based in the United States